The Peruvian Pacific sardine (scientific name Sardinops sagax sagax) is a subspecies of the South American pilchard found in Peru. Related subspecies and species of international importance include Sardinops sagax caeruleus (USA), Sardinops sagax melanosticta (Japan), and Sardina pilchardus (Spain). Its geographical distribution extends from the Gulf of Guayaquil (Ecuador) up to Talcahuano (Chile). The most important location of the fish in Peru is Paita, Parachique, Santa Rosa, and Chimbote.

In November 2006, Peru obtained the right to use the term sardine, accompanied on the name of the fatherland and the scientific name, to commercialize this product and to assure its revenue to the markets of the world.

References 

The Peruvian sardine, Sardinops sagax : Historical analysis of the fishery (1978-2005)

Clupeidae
Fish of the Pacific Ocean
Western South American coastal fauna